A regulated market (RM) or coordinated market is an idealized system where the government or other organizations oversee the market, control the forces of supply and demand, and to some extent regulate the market actions. This can include tasks such as determining who is allowed to enter the market and/or what prices may be charged. The majority of financial markets such as stock exchanges are regulated, whereas over-the-counter markets are usually not at all or only moderately regulated.

One of the reasons for regulation can be the importance of the regulated activity - meaning the harm suffered should the industry fail would be so fatal that regulators (governments, legislators) cannot afford the risk. This includes fields like banking or financial services. Secondly, it is common for some markets to be regulated under the claim that they are natural monopolies, or that a monopoly would very likely appear should there be no regulation. It is crucial to prevent misuse of monopoly power, as this can lead to delivery of poor services with very high prices. This includes for example the telecommunications, water, gas, or electricity supply. Often, regulated markets are established during the partial privatisation of government controlled utility assets.

A variety of forms of regulations exist in a regulated market. These include controls, oversights, anti-discrimination, environmental protection, taxation, and labor laws.

In a regulated market, the government regulatory agency may legislate regulations that privilege special interests, known as regulatory capture.

Changes in regulation 
Regulation is subject to changes over time, due to both technological advances as well as the change in attitude towards regulation in general. An example for industries that are no longer regulated is the rail service or airlines in the US. On the other hand, there are also industries that did not need regulation in the past, but are in need of it now. This includes for example the real estate market.

Another category are the markets that encountered major changes in regulatory approaches due to various crises. A prime example are stock exchanges following stock market crashes.

The practice of regulating markets dates back centuries when ancient societies relied on standardised weights and measurements and practised punishment for theft and fraud. For the most part, market regulations have been imposed by the central governments and to a lesser extent by interest groups. One notable example of such interest groups is medieval guilds. They were associations of merchants and artisans that controlled the practise of their profession in their particular area. Guilds defined requirements for practising their profession, which usually meant that only guild members could practise their profession or sell their goods within their city. Since the beginning of the 20th century, labour groups at times have had regulatory roles in some markets.

Controversy 
Generally, regulation is a very polarising issue. Those who are in favour of regulating usually see it as beneficial to the wider society. This has to do for example with regulations targeting ecological, racial, or religion related issues. On the contrary, those against regulation see it as a tool for lobbying or as a source for creating unfair competition, be it intentional or not. Some advocates of free market generally see any regulation except for the most essential ones as costly and inefficient.

Examples of regulatory bodies 

 Food and Drug Administration (FDA)
 Securities and Exchange Commission (SEC)
 Environmental Protection Agency (EPA)

See also 
 Better Regulation Commission
 Bureaucracy
 Code of Federal Regulations
 Deregulation
 European Union directive
 European Union regulation
 Free market
 Mixed economy

References 

Free market
Economic systems
Market (economics)